is a former Japanese football player.

Playing career
Oishi was born in Shizuoka on July 7, 1972. After graduating from University of Tsukuba, he joined Verdy Kawasaki in 1995. However he could hardly play in the match behind Japan national team goalkeeper Shinkichi Kikuchi. In 1997, he played many matches because Kikuchi got hurt. In April 1998, he moved to Sanfrecce Hiroshima on loan. However he could not play at all in the match and he returned Verdy Kawasaki in September. In 1999, he moved to new club Yokohama FC in Japan Football League (JFL). The club won the champions for 2 years in a row (1999-2000). He also played as regular goalkeeper in 1999. However he could hardly play in the match in 2000. In 2001, he moved to JFL club Jatco TT (later Jatco). He played many matches in 2 seasons and retired end of 2002 season.

Club statistics

References

External links

biglobe.ne.jp

1972 births
Living people
University of Tsukuba alumni
Association football people from Shizuoka Prefecture
Japanese footballers
J1 League players
Japan Football League players
Tokyo Verdy players
Sanfrecce Hiroshima players
Yokohama FC players
Jatco SC players
Association football goalkeepers